Ryan Domotor is a Canadian politician, who was elected to the Legislative Assembly of Saskatchewan in the 2020 Saskatchewan general election. He represents the electoral district of Cut Knife-Turtleford as a member of the Saskatchewan Party.

References 

Living people
21st-century Canadian politicians
Saskatchewan Party MLAs
Year of birth missing (living people)